Youssef Haraoui  (born on 12 May 1965 Algiers) is a retired Algerian professional football midfielder. He played for clubs in Europe, including SC Abbeville, ŠK Slovan Bratislava, G.D. Chaves, Karabükspor, Bursaspor and Karşıyaka S.K. as well as the Algeria national football team.

Honours

Club
 ŠK Slovan Bratislava
 Czechoslovak First League: 1991–92

References

External links
 
 

1965 births
Living people
Algerian footballers
Algeria international footballers
1992 African Cup of Nations players
ŠK Slovan Bratislava players
G.D. Chaves players
Kardemir Karabükspor footballers
Bursaspor footballers
Karşıyaka S.K. footballers
Czechoslovak First League players
Primeira Liga players
Süper Lig players
Expatriate footballers in Turkey
Expatriate footballers in Portugal
Footballers from Algiers
Expatriate footballers in Slovakia
Expatriate footballers in Czechoslovakia
Algerian expatriate sportspeople in France
Algerian expatriate sportspeople in Turkey
Algerian expatriate footballers
Algerian expatriate sportspeople in Portugal
Algerian expatriate sportspeople in Czechoslovakia
Algerian expatriate sportspeople in Slovakia
Le Puy Foot 43 Auvergne players
SC Abbeville players
Association football midfielders
21st-century Algerian people